The Manitoba Agricultural Museum is dedicated to collecting vintage farm machinery and buildings from 1900 and before. Located on  near Austin, Manitoba in the Municipality of North Norfolk, to date they have amassed over 500 pieces of machinery and a pioneer village consisting of more than 20 buildings complete with artifacts. This is Canada's largest collection of vintage equipment. The facilities include a camping and picnic grounds and a souvenir shop.

Throughout the year the museum offers various tours, schools and hands on experiences climaxing with Annual Manitoba Threshermen's Reunion and Stampede and various other expositions. The annual Threshermen's Reunion and Stampede is held near the end of July.

Attractions 
The Threshermen's Reunion offers a large collection of antique steam and gas tractors as well as the other equipment that was used on early farms. Every afternoon during the reunion a parade showcases some 12 steam engines and dozens of "gas" tractors and machinery. After the parade venture into the fair grounds and watch an early steam powered saw mill blaze through logs to make planks that were the foundation of pioneer buildings. When supper time rolls around come to the Corn and Barley Corral where you can find a steam tractor steaming corn!  Every evening there is a rodeo followed by a free dance.

The Manitoba Amateur Radio Museum is also located on the grounds. This museum is dedicated to collecting, restoring and operation antique communication equipment and now has over 3700 artifacts on display. Its operating call signs are VE4ARM and VE4MTR.

Gallery

See also	
Canada Agriculture and Food Museum 
Ross Farm Museum
Central Experimental Farm 
Agriculture in Canada 
Ontario Agricultural Museum

Affiliations
The Museum is affiliated with: CMA,  CHIN, and Virtual Museum of Canada.

References

External links
Manitoba Threshermen's Reunion & Stampede
Museum Website
Facebook Page
 Manitoba Amateur Radio Museum Website

Amateur radio organizations
Telecommunications museums
Museums in Manitoba
Agriculture museums in Canada
Open-air museums in Canada